Žilindar (Serbian Cyrillic: Жилиндар) is a mountain on the border of Serbia and Montenegro, between towns of Sjenica and Berane, on the central edge of Pešter plateau. Its highest peak Žilindar has an elevation of 1,616 meters above sea level.

References

Mountains of Serbia
Mountains of Montenegro